This is an incomplete list of hospitals and research centers in Pune, Maharashtra, India.

References

Pune
 
Pune-related lists
Lists of buildings and structures in Maharashtra
Pune